Chrysomesia is a genus of moths in the family Erebidae.

Species
Chrysomesia barbicostata (Hampson, 1903)
Chrysomesia lophoptera (Turner, 1940)

References

Natural History Museum Lepidoptera generic names catalog

Nudariina
Moth genera